Futebol Clube de Arouca is a football club based in Arouca, Porto Metropolitan Area, Portugal. Founded in 1951, the club plays in the Primeira Liga, holding home games at Estádio Municipal de Arouca, with a 5,000-seat capacity.

History
Founded on 25 December 1951, as a FC Porto subsidiary, Arouca spent the first five decades of its existence in the Aveiro regional leagues. In only two years (2006–08) it managed to reach the third division, being managed by television (RTP) presenter Jorge Gabriel for a few months during that timeframe.

Arouca managed its fourth promotion in only seven years at the end of 2012–13, reaching the Primeira Liga for the first time in its history. Subsequently, the Arouca Municipality awarded the club the Medal of Gold Merit for its achievement, with the organization also being granted extra financial means to renovate and expand its stadium.

In 2015–16 under Lito Vidigal, Arouca finished a best-ever fifth place, qualifying for the first time to the UEFA Europa League. After beating Heracles Almelo of the Netherlands on the away goals rule, they lost the play-off 3–1 after extra time to Olympiacos of Greece. A year after their peak finish, Arouca were relegated, ending their four years at the top.

A two-year spell in the second division for Arouca ended in May 2019 when on the last day of the season, they lost to U.D. Oliveirense and Varzim S.C. defeated Académica de Coimbra; this ended nine years in the professional leagues. The 2019–20 season was truncated due to the COVID-19 pandemic and Arouca and Vizela were due to be promoted because of their final position; competitors Olhanense successfully appealed at the Court of Arbitration for Sport for these promotions to be suspended.

Players

Current squad

Out on loan

Top scorers

Managerial history

  Acácio Figueiredo (2000–01)
  Francisco Baptista (2001–02)
  Artur Quaresma (2003–04)
  Vasco Coelho (2004–05)
  Rui Correia (2006–07)
  Jorge Gabriel (2007–08)
  José Pedro (2008–09)
  Carlos Secretário (2009)
  Henrique Nunes (Dec 9, 2009 – Sept 20, 2011)
  Vítor Oliveira (Sept 21, 2011 – June 30, 2013)
  Pedro Emanuel (July 1, 2013 – May 25, 2015)
  Lito Vidigal (2015 – February 10, 2017)
   Armando Evangelista (June 2019 – present)

Honours
Segunda Divisão
2009–10
Terceira Divisão
2007–08
Aveiro Regional League
2006–07, 2002–03

Seasons

Last updated: 17 May 2016

European record

Notes
 3Q: Third qualifying round
 PO: Play-off

References

External links
  
 Zerozero team profile

 
1951 establishments in Portugal
Association football clubs established in 1951
Football clubs in Portugal
Primeira Liga clubs
Liga Portugal 2 clubs